"Perchance to Dream" is episode nine of the American television anthology series The Twilight Zone. It originally aired on November 27, 1959, on CBS. 
The title of the episode and the Charles Beaumont short story that inspired it is taken from Hamlet's "To be, or not to be" speech.

Opening narration

Plot
Edward Hall seeks the aid of psychiatrist Dr. Eliot Rathmann. When he first enters the doctor's office, so tired he is barely able to stand, Rathmann helps him to the couch. Hall begins to drift into sleep, but suddenly jolts awake and gets up. When pressed by Rathmann, he explains he has a heart condition, and also believes that his overactive imagination is severely out of control, to the point where he's been able to see and feel something that is not there. Due to this, his heart condition is especially dangerous. He also explains that, when he has allowed himself to sleep he has been dreaming in chapters, as if in a movie serial. In his dreams, Maya "The Cat Girl", a carnival dancer, lures him first into a funhouse and later onto a roller coaster in an attempt to scare him to death.

He is now convinced that if he falls asleep, he'll die. On the other hand, keeping himself awake will put too much of a strain on his heart. Feeling that Rathmann cannot help him, Hall starts to leave, but stops when he sees that Rathmann's receptionist looks exactly like Maya. Terrified, he runs back into Rathmann's office and jumps out of the window.

In reality, the doctor calls his receptionist into his office, where Hall lies on the couch, his eyes closed. Rathmann tells the receptionist that Hall came in, laid down, immediately fell asleep, and then a few moments later let out a scream and died. "Well, I guess there are worse ways to go," the doctor says philosophically. "At least he died peacefully..."

Closing narration

Episode notes
This was the first episode aired that was written by Charles Beaumont (and also the first that was not written by Rod Serling).
"Throughout the TV filming, Florey strove for quality. It might have been the most expensive MGM feature. He rooted out the meanings of certain lines, frequently surprising me with symbols and shadings I'd neither planned nor suspected. The set was truly impressionistic, recalling the days of Caligari and Liliom. The costumes were generally perfect. And in the starring role, Richard Conte gave a performance which displays both intensity and subtlety." ―Charles Beaumont writing in The Magazine of Fantasy & Science Fiction, December 1959.
This is one of several episodes from season one to have its opening title sequence plastered over with the opening for season two. This was done during the Summer of 1961 in order to give the re-running episodes of season one the new look that the show would take in the upcoming second season.
It has been speculated that this episode and the novella which spawned it served as Wes Craven's inspiration for the Nightmare on Elm Street series, particularly since both Craven (who himself directed several episodes of TZ during the 1980s) and Beaumont deal with a common theme; fear of sleep, over something which literally kills in one's dreams. Craven, however, insisted that his work was never inspired by Beaumont's.

Radio drama
The episode was adapted for radio in 2002 featuring Fred Willard as Edward Hall. It was then released as part of The Twilight Zone Radio Dramas – Volume 9 collection.

Notes

References
Zicree, Marc Scott: The Twilight Zone Companion.  Sillman-James Press, 1982 (second edition)
DeVoe, Bill. (2008). Trivia from The Twilight Zone. Albany, GA: Bear Manor Media. 
Grams, Martin. (2008). The Twilight Zone: Unlocking the Door to a Television Classic. Churchville, MD: OTR Publishing.

External links
 

1959 American television episodes
The Twilight Zone (1959 TV series season 1) episodes
Television episodes about dreams
Television shows written by Charles Beaumont
Television episodes about nightmares